Chargan (Bulgarian: Чарган) - a village in South-Eastern Bulgaria in the Yambol Province, in the Tundzha Municipality. According to the National Institute of Statistics, in the year of 2011, the village had 576 inhabitants.

Honours
Chargan Ridge in Graham Land, Antarctica is named after the village.

References

Villages in Yambol Province